Basilepta is a genus of leaf beetles in the subfamily Eumolpinae. It is generally distributed in Asia. A single species is also known from central Africa.

Species
The following species are placed in the genus:

 Basilepta abdominalis (Jacoby, 1908)
 Basilepta affinis (Baly, 1867)
 Basilepta aggregata (Jacoby, 1908)
 Basilepta amboinensis (Baly, 1867)
 Basilepta amamiensis Chûjô, 1957
 Basilepta andamanensis (Jacoby, 1908)
 Basilepta andrewesi (Jacoby, 1903)
 Basilepta angulicollis (Duvivier, 1892)
 Basilepta anthracina (Baly, 1867)
 Basilepta antiqua (Jacoby, 1908)
 Basilepta apicalis (Baly, 1867)
 Basilepta apicicornis (Lefèvre, 1891)
 Basilepta apicipennis Chen, 1935
 Basilepta armata (Baly, 1867)
 Basilepta aruensis (Jacoby, 1884)
 Basilepta assimilis Weise, 1922
 Basilepta atripennis (Clark, 1865)
 Basilepta atripes (Jacoby, 1896)
 Basilepta aureocuprea (Baly, 1867)
 Basilepta bacboensis Eroshkina, 1994
 Basilepta bakeri Weise, 1922
 Basilepta balyi (Harold, 1877)
 Basilepta bengelensis (Duvivier, 1891)
 Basilepta bicollis Tan, 1988
 Basilepta bicolor (Lefèvre, 1893)
 Basilepta bicolorata Chen, 1940
 Basilepta bicoloripennis (Pic, 1930)
 Basilepta bicoloripes (Pic, 1935): (homonym of B. bicoloripes (Pic, 1930))
 Basilepta bidens Tan, 1988
 Basilepta bimaculicollis (Jacoby, 1892)
 Basilepta binghami (Jacoby, 1908)
 Basilepta binhana (Pic, 1930)
 Basilepta binominata (Achard, 1914)
 Basilepta binotata (Lefèvre, 1886)
 Basilepta bipartita (Jacoby, 1896)
 Basilepta bipunctata (Jacoby, 1887)
 Basilepta bipustulata (Baly, 1867)
 Basilepta birungana Weise, 1924
 Basilepta bistrigata (Jacoby, 1908)
 Basilepta bisulcata Chen, 1976
 Basilepta bituberculata (Jacoby, 1887)
 Basilepta bohemani (Baly, 1864)
 Basilepta borodinensis Kimoto, 1979
 Basilepta brevicollis (Jacoby, 1884)
 Basilepta brunnea (Jacoby, 1896)
 Basilepta buonloica Eroshkina, 1994
 Basilepta cardoni (Jacoby, 1900)
 Basilepta castanea (Baly, 1867)
 Basilepta chalcea (Jacoby, 1908)
 Basilepta chapaensis (Pic, 1930)
 Basilepta chapuisi (Jacoby, 1896)
 Basilepta chiangmaiensis Kimoto & Gressitt, 1982
 Basilepta clypeata (Jacoby, 1887)
 Basilepta concinnicollis (Baly, 1878)
 Basilepta confusa (Clavareau, 1914)
 Basilepta congregata (Jacoby, 1908)
 Basilepta consobrina Chen, 1940
 Basilepta convexa Tan, 1988
 Basilepta convexicollis (Jacoby, 1908)
 Basilepta cornutua Chûjô, 1956
 Basilepta costata (Baly, 1864)
 Basilepta crassipes Chen, 1976
 Basilepta cribricollis (Motschulsky, 1860)
 Basilepta cribricollis (Jacoby, 1908) (homonym of above)
 Basilepta cribrithorax Chen, 1940
 Basilepta cumingi (Baly, 1864)
 Basilepta cupreata (Baly, 1867)
 Basilepta cupripennis (Baly, 1867)
 Basilepta cyanea (Lefèvre, 1891)
 Basilepta cylindrica (Baly, 1864)
 Basilepta cyrtopus (Lefèvre, 1885)
 Basilepta davidi (Lefèvre, 1877)
 Basilepta declivis Tan, 1988
 Basilepta dembickyi Medvedev, 2005
 Basilepta denticollis (Jacoby, 1892)
 Basilepta deqenensis Tan, 1988
 Basilepta dharwarensis (Jacoby, 1908)
 Basilepta dhunchena Kimoto & Takizawa, 1981
 Basilepta dilaticornis (Jacoby, 1884)
 Basilepta dimidiaticornis (Jacoby, 1896)
 Basilepta dimidiatipes (Jacoby, 1908)
 Basilepta discicollis (Jacoby, 1895)
 Basilepta diversipes (Baly, 1867)
 Basilepta djoui Gressitt & Kimoto, 1961
 Basilepta dohrni (Jacoby, 1899)
 Basilepta dormeri (Baly, 1877)
 Basilepta dubiosa (Jacoby, 1908)
 Basilepta duvivieri (Jacoby, 1908)
 Basilepta eakaoensis Eroshkina, 1994
 Basilepta elegans Chûjô, 1956
 Basilepta elegantula (Baly, 1867)
 Basilepta elongata Tan, 1988
 Basilepta eroshkinae Medvedev, 2009
 Basilepta evanescens (Baly, 1867)
 Basilepta fabrei (Lefèvre, 1887)
 Basilepta fairmairei (Jacoby, 1887)
 Basilepta feae (Jacoby, 1892)
 Basilepta fedorenkoi Medvedev, 2012
 Basilepta femorata (Jacoby, 1908)
 Basilepta flavescens (Motschulsky, 1866)
 Basilepta flavicaudis Tan, 1988
 Basilepta flavolimbata (Jacoby, 1908)
 Basilepta forticornis Weise, 1922
 Basilepta foveicollis (Baly, 1864)
 Basilepta fukienensis Gressitt & Kimoto, 1961
 Basilepta fulva (Jacoby, 1908)
 Basilepta fulvescens Eroshkina, 1997
 Basilepta fulvicornis (Jacoby, 1904)
 Basilepta fulvipes (Motschulsky, 1860)
 Basilepta fulvofasciata (Jacoby, 1908)
 Basilepta fulvotibialis (Jacoby, 1908)
 Basilepta fuscolimbata Tan, 1988
 Basilepta fyanensis Kimoto & Gressitt, 1982
 Basilepta gemmata Weise, 1922
 Basilepta geniculata (Lefèvre, 1891)
 Basilepta gestroi (Jacoby, 1884)
 Basilepta gibbosa (Jacoby, 1890)
 Basilepta glabricollis (Jacoby, 1908)
 Basilepta gracilipes (Jacoby, 1908)
 Basilepta gracilis Chen, 1935
 Basilepta granulosa Tan, 1988
 Basilepta grossa Medvedev, 1995
 Basilepta hampsoni (Jacoby, 1908)
 Basilepta hattoriae Takizawa, 1983
 Basilepta humeralis (Baly, 1867)
 Basilepta hirayamai (Chûjô, 1935)
 Basilepta hirticollis (Baly, 1874)
 Basilepta imitans (Jacoby, 1908)
 Basilepta impressipennis (Jacoby, 1887)
 Basilepta incerta (Pic, 1928)
 Basilepta inconspicua (Jacoby, 1908)
 Basilepta indica (Jacoby, 1892)
 Basilepta instabilis (Jacoby, 1908)
 Basilepta intacta (Jacoby, 1908)
 Basilepta interrupta Medvedev, 2010
 Basilepta irregularis (Jacoby, 1900)
 Basilepta issikii Chûjô, 1956
 Basilepta jacobyi (Lefèvre, 1884)
 Basilepta jansoni (Baly, 1864)
 Basilepta janthina (Lefèvre, 1885)
 Basilepta javanensis (Baly, 1867)
 Basilepta jeanvoinei (Pic, 1928)
 Basilepta kandyensis Kimoto, 2003
 Basilepta kaszabi Lopatin, 1962
 Basilepta kaulbachi (Bryant, 1939)
 Basilepta korhongensis Kimoto & Gressitt, 1982
 Basilepta laeta Medvedev, 1992
 Basilepta laeta Eroshkina, 1994 (homonym?)
 Basilepta laevicollis (Jacoby, 1884)
 Basilepta laevigata Tan, 1981
 Basilepta laevis (Baly, 1867)
 Basilepta lameyi (Lefèvre, 1893)
 Basilepta latefasciata (Jacoby, 1908)
 Basilepta latericosta Gressitt & Kimoto, 1961
 Basilepta lateripunctata (Baly, 1867)
 Basilepta latipennis (Pic, 1928)
 Basilepta leechi (Jacoby, 1888)
 Basilepta lefevrei (Jacoby, 1887)
 Basilepta lewisi (Jacoby, 1887)
 Basilepta livida Kimoto & Gressitt, 1982
 Basilepta longicornis (Jacoby, 1887)
 Basilepta longipennis (Pic, 1931)
 Basilepta longipes Baly, 1860
 Basilepta longitarsalis Tan, 1992
 Basilepta luzonica Weise, 1922
 Basilepta maai Kimoto & Gressitt, 1982
 Basilepta maculiceps (Jacoby, 1908)
 Basilepta maculipennis (Jacoby, 1908)
 Basilepta magnicollis Tan, 1988
 Basilepta maheensis (Jacoby, 1908)
 Basilepta makiharai Kimoto, 2001
 Basilepta malayana Medvedev, 2016
 Basilepta manaliensis Shukla, 1960
 Basilepta manii Shukla, 1960
 Basilepta marginalis Kimoto & Gressitt, 1982
 Basilepta marginata (Jacoby, 1884)
 Basilepta martini (Lefèvre, 1885)
 Basilepta medvedevi Eroshkina, 1997
 Basilepta melanopus (Lefèvre, 1893)
 Basilepta mindanaica Medvedev, 2009
 Basilepta mindorensis Medvedev, 1995
 Basilepta minor (Pic, 1929)
 Basilepta minutipunctata Tan, 1988
 Basilepta minutissima Kimoto & Gressitt, 1982
 Basilepta minuta (Jacoby, 1905)
 Basilepta miyatakei Kimoto & Gressitt, 1982
 Basilepta modesta (Jacoby, 1885)
 Basilepta modiglianii (Jacoby, 1896)
 Basilepta momeitensis (Jacoby, 1908)
 Basilepta montana (Jacoby, 1908)
 Basilepta morimotoi Kimoto & Gressitt, 1982
 Basilepta motschulskyi (Lefèvre, 1884)
 Basilepta multicolor (Jacoby, 1894)
 Basilepta multicostata (Jacoby, 1892)
 Basilepta multimaculata Kimoto & Gressitt, 1982
 Basilepta musae (Bryant, 1938)
 Basilepta napolovi Medvedev, 2015
 Basilepta nala Takizawa, 1984
 Basilepta nigra (Baly, 1867)
 Basilepta nigricornis (Baly, 1864)
 Basilepta nigripecta Gressitt & Kimoto, 1961
 Basilepta nigripes (Baly, 1864)
 Basilepta nigrita (Baly, 1867)
 Basilepta nigrita Medvedev, 1997 (homonym of above?)
 Basilepta nigritarse (Jacoby, 1884)
 Basilepta nigroaenea (Baly, 1867)
 Basilepta nigrobimarginata (Jacoby, 1908)
 Basilepta nigrocincta (Jacoby, 1908)
 Basilepta nigrofasciata (Jacoby, 1889)
 Basilepta nigrolineata (Jacoby, 1908)
 Basilepta nigromaculata (Lefèvre, 1891)
 Basilepta nigromarginata (Jacoby, 1896)
 Basilepta nigrosuturata (Jacoby, 1896)
 Basilepta nigroviridis (Jacoby, 1896)
 Basilepta nilgiriensis (Jacoby, 1903)
 Basilepta nitida (Baly, 1867)
 Basilepta nobilitata (Jacoby, 1895)
 Basilepta notabilis Chen, 1935
 Basilepta nyalamensis Tan, 1981
 Basilepta oberthuri (Lefèvre, 1877)
 Basilepta obliterata (Jacoby, 1887)
 Basilepta oblonga (Motschulsky, 1866)
 Basilepta oblongopunctata (Jacoby, 1908)
 Basilepta obscuromaculata (Jacoby, 1908)
 Basilepta orientalis (Jacoby, 1890)
 Basilepta ornatissima (Jacoby, 1884)
 Basilepta ornata (Jacoby, 1908)
 Basilepta ovalis Chen, 1940
 Basilepta pacholatkoi Medvedev, 2005
 Basilepta palawanica Weise, 1922
 Basilepta pallida (Baly, 1864)
 Basilepta pallidicolor (Pic, 1929)
 Basilepta pallidipes (Baly, 1867)
 Basilepta pallidula (Baly, 1874)
 Basilepta parvula (Jacoby, 1896)
 Basilepta pectoralis (Pic, 1931)
 Basilepta philippinensis (Lefèvre, 1885)
 Basilepta picea (Baly, 1867)
 Basilepta piceipes (Baly, 1867)
 Basilepta piceomaculata (Baly, 1867)
 Basilepta pici Eroshkina, 1994
 Basilepta picimane (Jacoby, 1908)
 Basilepta picturata (Motschulsky, 1866)
 Basilepta picta (Baly, 1867)
 Basilepta pinguis Chen, 1940
 Basilepta placida (Baly, 1867)
 Basilepta plagiosa (Baly, 1878)
 Basilepta plicata (Pic, 1929)
 Basilepta polita Weise, 1926
 Basilepta pretiosa (Jacoby, 1908)
 Basilepta proxima (Baly, 1867)
 Basilepta pseudobeccarii Eroshkina, 1997
 Basilepta pubicollis (Jacoby, 1895)
 Basilepta pubiventer Tan, 1988
 Basilepta pulchella (Baly, 1867)
 Basilepta puncticollis (Lefèvre, 1889)
 Basilepta punctifrons An, 1988
 Basilepta punctostriata Gressitt & Kimoto, 1961
 Basilepta purpureofasciata (Jacoby, 1894)
 Basilepta pusilla (Gyllenhal, 1808)
 Basilepta quadrifasciata (Jacoby, 1908)
 Basilepta quadrimaculata (Pic, 1931)
 Basilepta quadrinotata (Lefèvre, 1891)
 Basilepta quercicola Takizawa, 2017
 Basilepta regularis Tan, 1981
 Basilepta remota Tan, 1984
 Basilepta rondoni Kimoto & Gressitt, 1982
 Basilepta rotundicollis (Jacoby, 1896)
 Basilepta rubimaculata Tan, 1988
 Basilepta ruficollis (Jacoby, 1885)
 Basilepta rugosa (Jacoby, 1884)
 Basilepta scabrosa (Baly, 1864)
 Basilepta schawalleri Medvedev, 1992
 Basilepta scutellaris Chen, 1963
 Basilepta semicaerulea (Jacoby, 1892)
 Basilepta semicostata (Jacoby, 1896)
 Basilepta semiglabrata (Jacoby, 1908)
 Basilepta semilaeva (Jacoby, 1908)
 Basilepta semipurpurea (Jacoby, 1892)
 Basilepta semirufa (Pic, 1930)
 Basilepta semistriata (Jacoby, 1908)
 Basilepta semperi (Lefèvre, 1891)
 Basilepta separata (Jacoby, 1908)
 Basilepta severa Weise, 1922
 Basilepta sikkimensis (Jacoby, 1900)
 Basilepta simplex (Jacoby, 1884)
 Basilepta sinara Weise, 1922
 Basilepta speciosa (Lefèvre, 1893)
 Basilepta spenceri Kimoto & Gressitt, 1982
 Basilepta splendens (Hope, 1831)
 Basilepta splendida Weise, 1922
 Basilepta staudingeri (Jacoby, 1894)
 Basilepta stigmosa (Jacoby, 1895)
 Basilepta strigicollis (Baly, 1867)
 Basilepta subcostata (Jacoby, 1889)
 Basilepta subdepressa (Jacoby, 1908)
 Basilepta sublaevipennis (Jacoby, 1908)
 Basilepta sublateralis (Clavareau, 1914)
 Basilepta subpunctata (Achard, 1914)
 Basilepta subruficollis Tan, 1993
 Basilepta subtuberosa Tan, 1988
 Basilepta sulawesiana Medvedev, 2009
 Basilepta sumatrensis (Jacoby, 1884)
 Basilepta suturalis (Motschulsky, 1866)
 Basilepta sylhetensis (Jacoby, 1908)
 Basilepta tavoyensis (Jacoby, 1908)
 Basilepta terminata (Jacoby, 1908)
 Basilepta thoracica (Lefèvre, 1886)
 Basilepta tibialis (Baly, 1867)
 Basilepta triangularis (Motschulsky, 1866)
 Basilepta tricarinata Tan, 1988
 Basilepta tricolor (Baly, 1877)
 Basilepta trivittata (Baly, 1867)
 Basilepta tuberculata (Baly, 1867)
 Basilepta uenoi Nakane, 1958
 Basilepta uniformis (Motschulsky, 1866)
 Basilepta unipunctata (Jacoby, 1908)
 Basilepta variabilis (Duvivier, 1892)
 Basilepta varians Chûjô, 1956
 Basilepta varicolor (Jacoby, 1885)
 Basilepta varipennis (Jacoby, 1896)
 Basilepta violaceofasciata (Jacoby, 1892)
 Basilepta violacea (Jacoby, 1884)
 Basilepta virendri Shukla, 1960
 Basilepta viridiaenea (Baly, 1864)
 Basilepta viridicyanea Kimoto & Gressitt, 1982
 Basilepta viridiornata (Baly, 1867)
 Basilepta viridipennis (Motschulsky, 1860)
 Basilepta viridis (Pic, 1935)
 Basilepta viridissima (Jacoby, 1896)
 Basilepta vittipennis (Achard, 1914)
 Basilepta wallacei (Baly, 1867)
 Basilepta wallardiensis (Jacoby, 1908)
 Basilepta waterhousei (Jacoby, 1908)
 Basilepta weigeli Medvedev, 2015
 Basilepta weisei (Jacoby, 1900)
 Basilepta weixiensis Tan, 1988
 Basilepta yangsoensis Chen, 1940
 Basilepta yimnae Gressitt & Kimoto, 1961

Species moved to Parascela:
 Basilepta rugipennis Tan, 1988
 Nodostoma hirsutum Jacoby, 1908
 Nodostoma tuberosum Jacoby, 1887

Species moved to Cleorina:
 Basilepta bella (Jacoby, 1892): synonym of Cleorina aenomicans (Baly, 1867)
 Basilepta bhamoensis (Jacoby, 1892): synonym of Cleorina sculpturata (Motschulsky, 1860)
 Basilepta capitata (Jacoby, 1892): synonym of Cleorina sculpturata (Motschulsky, 1860)
 Basilepta sculpturata (Motschulsky, 1860)

Synonyms:
 Basilepta aenomicans Chûjô, 1956: synonym of Basilepta varicolor (Jacoby, 1885)
 Basilepta anchoralis (Jacoby, 1900): synonym of Basilepta pubicollis (Jacoby, 1895)
 Basilepta beccarii (Jacoby, 1884): synonym of Basilepta flavescens (Motschulsky, 1866)
 Basilepta bicoloripes (Pic, 1930): synonym of Basilepta fulvipes (Motschulsky, 1860)
 Basilepta bicolorata Chûjô, 1956 (preoccupied by Basilepta bicolorata Chen, 1940): synonym of Basilepta varians Chûjô, 1956
 Basilepta chinensis (Lefèvre, 1877): synonym of Basilepta fulvipes (Motschulsky, 1860)
 Basilepta consimilis Chûjô, 1956: synonym of Basilepta varians Chûjô, 1956
 Basilepta cyanipennis (Lefèvre, 1893): synonym of Basilepta subcostata (Jacoby, 1889)
 Basilepta dorunga Aslam, 1968 (replacement name for Basilepta bicolorata Chûjô, 1956): synonym of Basilepta varians Chûjô, 1956
 Basilepta femorata (Jacoby, 1908): synonym of Basilepta splendens (Hope, 1831)
 Basilepta frontalis (Baly, 1867): synonym of Basilepta viridipennis (Motschulsky, 1860)
 Basilepta gigantea Chûjô, 1938: synonym of Basilepta modesta (Jacoby, 1885)
 Basilepta harmandi (Lefèvre, 1893): synonym of Basilepta tricolor (Baly, 1877)
 Basilepta haroldi (Jacoby, 1908): synonym of Basilepta viridipennis (Motschulsky, 1860)
 Basilepta ikomai Chûjô, 1961: synonym of Basilepta nigrofasciata (Jacoby, 1889)
 Basilepta kumatai Kimoto & Takizawa, 1973: synonym of Basilepta binhana (Pic, 1930)
 Basilepta laeviuscula (Weise, 1910): synonym of Basilepta pallidula (Baly, 1874)
 Basilepta limbata (Lefèvre, 1893): synonym of Basilepta puncticollis (Lefèvre, 1889)
 Basilepta nigriventris (Lefèvre, 1893): synonym of Basilepta puncticollis (Lefèvre, 1889)
 Basilepta obscura (Jacoby, 1908): synonym of Basilepta subcostata (Jacoby, 1889)
 Basilepta occipitalis (Jacoby, 1908): synonym of Basilepta viridipennis (Motschulsky, 1860)
 Basilepta sakaii Takizawa, 1987: synonym of Basilepta subcostata (Jacoby, 1889)
 Basilepta taiwana Chûjô, 1956: synonym of Basilepta varians Chûjô, 1956

Renamed species:
 Basilepta bella Eroshkina, 1997: renamed to Basilepta eroshkinae Medvedev, 2009
 Basilepta lateralis (Matsumura, 1911) (preoccupied): renamed to Basilepta sublateralis (Clavareau, 1914)
 Basilepta lateripunctata (Jacoby, 1896) (preoccupied by Basilepta lateripunctata (Baly, 1867)): renamed to Basilepta vittipennis (Achard, 1914)
 Basilepta orientalis (Jacoby, 1908) (preoccupied by Basilepta orientalis (Jacoby, 1890)): renamed to Basilepta confusa (Clavareau, 1914)
 Basilepta pallidicornis Medvedev, 1995: renamed to Basilepta mindanaica Medvedev, 2009
 Basilepta puncticollis (Weise, 1889) (preoccupied by Basilepta puncticollis (Lefèvre, 1889)): renamed to Basilepta subpunctata (Achard, 1914)
 Basilepta thoracica (Jacoby, 1908) (preoccupied by Basilepta thoracica (Lefèvre, 1886)): renamed to Basilepta binominata (Achard, 1914)

References

Eumolpinae
Chrysomelidae genera
Beetles of Asia
Taxa named by Joseph Sugar Baly